Polski Trambesh is a town in central northern Bulgaria, part of Veliko Tarnovo Province. It is the administrative centre of the homonymous Polski Trambesh Municipality, which lies in the northeastern part of the Province. The town is located 36 kilometres from the provincial capital of Veliko Tarnovo, 45 km from Svishtov, 35 km from Pavlikeni, 33 km from Gorna Oryahovitsa, 22 km from Byala, Rousse Province and 40 km from Strazhitsa. As of December 2009, Polski Trambesh has a population of 4,546 inhabitants.

The town is situated near the Yantra River, in the central Danubian Plain. Polski Trambesh's name means "Trambesh of the fields", to distinguish it from Gorski Goren Trambesh ("upper Trambesh of the forests") and Gorski Dolen Trambesh ("lower Trambesh of the forests") in Gorna Oryahovitsa municipality. It is not known when Polski Trambesh was established, but in 1865 it was a village of 40-50 houses populated by Bulgarians and Turks. The construction of the Rousse-Gorna Oryahovitsa railway boosted its development in 1917, the village turned into an important merchant centre and some industry was established after World War I. Polski Trambesh was proclaimed a town in 1964.

Municipality

Polski Trambesh Municipality has an area of 463.6 square kilometres and includes the following 15 places:

Honours
Trambesh Peak on Brabant Island, Antarctica is named after the town.

References

External links
 Polski Trambesh municipality website 

Towns in Bulgaria
Populated places in Veliko Tarnovo Province